The Campeonato Brasileiro Sub 20 2008 (Under-20 Brazilian Championship) was the 3rd edition of the annual tournament organized by FGF, the Rio Grande do Sul State Football Federation. Only players 20 years old or younger are allowed to play. The competition was contested by all teams on the Campeonato Brasileiro Série A 2008, except from Vasco and São Paulo, which were replaced by Corinthians and Juventude. It began on December 8 and the final match was played on December 21, 2008.

The matches were played at four stadiums: Passo D'Areia and PUC Sport Stadium in Porto Alegre; Morada dos Quero-Queros in Alvorada; and Municipal Farroupilha in Alegrete.

After reaching the final for the second time in history, Grêmio won its first title. They have beaten city rivals Internacional in the semifinal match and then, in the final match, they came back from a 0-1 score against Sport to win the tournament.

Results

First stage

Group 1

Group 2

Group 3

Group 4

Quarterfinals

Semifinals

Third-place match

Final

2008
4
2008 in youth association football